The Finger Lakes AVA is an American Viticultural Area located in Upstate New York, south of Lake Ontario. It was established in 1982 and encompasses the eleven Finger Lakes, but the area around Canandaigua, Keuka, Seneca, and Cayuga Lakes contain the vast majority of vineyard plantings in the AVA. Cayuga and Seneca Lakes each have their own American Viticultural Areas completely contained within the Finger Lakes AVA (Cayuga Lake AVA and Seneca Lake AVA).  The Finger Lakes AVA includes  of vineyards and is the largest wine-producing region in New York State.

Climate 

The Finger Lakes AVA wine region is often compared to the German wine regions along the Rhine river. Riesling, one of the most important commercial  wine grape varieties grown in Germany, is also one of the most successful grape varieties grown in the Finger Lakes AVA.  Viticulturists in the Finger Lakes region grow a wide variety of grapes besides Riesling, including other European Vitis vinifera grapes, native American grapes, as well as French-American hybrid varieties.

The deep lakes in the region help to moderate the local microclimate.  Stored heat is released from the deep lakes during the winter, keeping the local climate mild relative to surrounding areas and preventing early season frost. Most vineyards are planted on steep hillsides overlooking the lakes, which help provide the vines with good drainage, better sun exposure, and a reduced risk of frost.

The soil in the region is generally deep, providing good drainage,  however there are some areas, such as on the west side of Seneca Lake, where the bedrock is close to the surface. The region is located in hardiness zones 6a and 5b.

History 

The first record of wine making in the Finger Lakes is in 1829, when William Warner Bostwick, an Episcopal minister in Hammondsport, planted Vitis labrusca shoots in his rectory garden.  Commercial viticulture officially began in 1862, when the Hammondsport and Pleasant Valley Wine Companies were founded. Two more companies were formed three years later. The region became famous for its sparkling wines, with the Pleasant Valley Wine Company winning European awards in 1867 and 1873. These successes spurred growth in commercial plantings in the area, and by the end of the century there was  planted.

A number of factors, including phylloxera, competition from California, and prohibition, combined to cause a decline in commercial viticulture production in the early 20th century.  Production resumed on a smaller scale after Prohibition was repealed.  After World War II, soldiers returning from Europe had developed a taste for drier wines from Vitis vinifera varieties, as opposed to the sweeter wines produced from native American grape varieties.  Unlike in California, winemakers in the Finger Lakes were unable to grow Vitis vinifera in the harsh winters. They experimented with French-American hybrid varieties with limited success. 

A major change in Finger Lakes viticulture occurred when Dr. Konstantin Frank, a Ukrainian immigrant with a PhD in Plant Science, came to work for the Cornell University Geneva Experiment station in 1951. Commercial growers and researchers at the Geneva Experiment Station were convinced that European Vitis vinifera varieties could not grow in the cold Finger Lakes climate. After years of planting Vitis vinifera in the colder climate of the Ukraine, Dr. Frank was sure that it could be grown in the Finger Lakes if grafted onto the proper, cold-hardy native rootstock.  He proved this in 1962 when he started Vinifera Wine Cellars, in Hammondsport.  Dr. Frank successfully grew and produced wine from Vitis vinifera grapes such as Riesling, Chardonnay, Pinot noir, Gewürztraminer, and Cabernet Sauvignon, grafted onto native rootstock.  Plantings of Vitis vinifera varieties spread throughout the region, reinvigorating the Finger Lakes wine region's growth and popularity.

As of 2008, there are nearly one hundred wineries in operation in the Finger Lakes AVA.

As of 2020 the Finger Lakes wine region is at risk due to the arrival of the spotted lanternfly from neighboring states. New York’s annual yield from orchards and vineyards has a value of $358.4 million, which could be devastated if the spotted lanternfly is not contained. Control measures, trapping and research are being conducted in high-risk areas of the state. Inspections of transport and plant material is occurring to prevent spread of populations. The DEC has put into place protective zones in areas in close contact with neighboring quarantine areas of other states. The DEC also encourages the public to be on the look out for the spotted lanternfly.

References

External links 
Survey of Finger Lakes Rieslings
 Finger Lakes Wine Country
 Winemaker interview touching upon viticultural specifics of the region

American Viticultural Areas
New York (state) wine
1862 establishments in New York (state)
Finger Lakes